The 1980 Floor Show was a rock musical spectacle featuring English rock musician David Bowie as the protagonist, held at the Marquee Club in Soho, London, on October 18–20, 1973. It was broadcast in the United States by NBC on November 16, 1973, as part of the series The Midnight Special, and presented the last performance of Bowie as his character Ziggy Stardust.

Lineup and content

The lineup included songs from the albums Aladdin Sane and Pin Ups, as well as a medley of "1984" with the then-unreleased song "Dodo". The title of the show was a play-on-words, referring to the song "1984" and "floor shows", capturing a transitional moment between the glamorous science fiction of the previous year's The Rise and Fall of Ziggy Stardust and the Spiders from Mars album and the dark dystopia of the Diamond Dogs album, released six months later. The live audience was made up of 200 fan club members.

Visual elements
The visual elements of the show referenced the Ziggy Stardust character, who, along with the Spiders from Mars, had been terminated by Bowie after a performance on July 3, 1973. The troupe of dancers wore crocheted cobweb-like costumes, and Bowie sported outfits designed by Freddi Buretti, Kansai Yamamoto and Natasha Korniloff, most notably a body-stocking outfit with a flame motif, as well as a fishnet full-leotard with stuffed gold lamé hands. The keyhole-cutout half-leotard outfit was inspired by the Dada artist/poet Tristan Tzara's 1921 production of La Coeur a Gaz. The choreography by Matt Mattox featured a sequence of dancers spelling out the words "1980", "Floor" and "Show" with their bodies.

Unauthorized releases
A bootleg record of The 1980 Floor Show, titled Dollars in Drag - The 1980 Floor Show, was released by The Amazing Kornyphone Record Label in 1974 (ASIN: B00RC7WEEO). A multi-disc DVD was later issued, showing some of Bowie's and his guests' lavish costumes and including excerpts of rehearsals and false starts.

Cast
 David Bowie – vocals, guitar, tambourine, harmonica
 Mick Ronson – electric guitar, backing vocals
 Trevor Bolder – electric bass
 Aynsley Dunbar – drums
 Mike Garson – keyboards
 Mark Carr-Pritchard (AKA Mark Pritchett) – guitar
 The Astronettes (Ava Cherry, Jason Guess, Geoffrey MacCormack) - backup singers

Guests
 Marianne Faithfull
 The Troggs
 Amanda Lear
 Carmen

Repertoire
Lyrics and music by David Bowie, unless otherwise indicated.
 "1984 / Dodo"
 "Sorrow" (Feldman / Goldstein / Gottehrer) – A cover of The McCoys
 "Bulerias" (David Allen) – Performed by Carmen, a Spanish glamenco/flamenco group produced by Tony Visconti
 "Everything's Alright" (Crouch / Konrad / Stavely / James / Karlson) – A cover of The Mojos
 "Space Oddity"
 "I Can't Explain" (Pete Townshend) – A cover of The Who
 "As Tears Go By" (Mick Jagger / Keith Richards / Andrew Loog Oldham ) – A cover of The Rolling Stones, performed by Marianne Faithfull
 "Time"
 "Wild Thing" (Chip Taylor) – Performed by The Troggs
 "The Jean Genie"
 "Rock 'n' Roll Suicide" [Unaired performance]
 "20th Century Blues" (Noël Coward) – A cover of Noël Coward, performed by Marianne Faithfull
 "Can Not Control Myself" (Reg Presley) – Performed by The Troggs
 "Strange Movies" (Reg Presley) – Performed by The Troggs
 "I Got You Babe" (Sonny Bono) – A cover of Sonny & Cher, performed by David Bowie and Marianne Faithfull

Credits
 Stan Harris – director and producer
 Rocco Urbisci – creative consultant
 Jaques Andre – associate producer
 Matt Mattox – choreographer
 Freddi Burretti – costume designer
 Kansai Yamamoto – costume designer
 Natasha Korniloff – costume designer
 Barbara Daley – make-up artist
 Billy The Kid – hairdresser
 George Underwood – Graphic Designer
 Ken Scott & Ground Control (Robin Mayhew) – mix

References

David Bowie
1970s American television series
Rock music television series